Malcolm Stewart McCorquodale, 1st Baron McCorquodale of Newton, KCVO, PC (29 March 1901 – 25 September 1971) was a British businessman and Conservative politician.

Background and education

McCorquodale was the son of Norman McCorquodale, of Winslow Hall, Buckinghamshire, and the grandson of George McCorquodale, founder of McCorquodale printers. His mother was Constance Helena, daughter of Edmund Charles Burton. He was educated at Harrow and Christ Church, Oxford.

Business career

McCorquodale was chairman of McCorquodale and Company Ltd, and a director of the Bank of Scotland.

Political career

At the 1931 general election, McCorquodale was elected as Member of Parliament (MP) for Sowerby, and held the seat at the 1935 election. in 1939, he was Parliamentary Private Secretary (PPS) to the President of the Board of Trade, Oliver Stanley. From 1940 to 1941, he fought in the Second World War as a Flight Lieutenant in the Royal Air Force Volunteer Reserve. From 1942 to 1945, he was PPS to the Minister of Labour, Ernest Bevin. In the Labour Party landslide at the 1945 general election, he lost his seat to Labour's John Belcher. In the same year, he was appointed as a Privy Councillor.

McCorquodale returned to Parliament two years later, when he was elected as MP for in Epsom at a by-election in December 1947, following the resignation of Conservative MP Sir Archibald Southby.  He retired from House of Commons at the 1955 general election and in September 1955, he was elevated to the peerage as Baron McCorquodale of Newton, of Newton-le-Willows in the County Palatine of Lancaster.

He was conferred a K.C.V.O. in the 1965 Birthday Honours.

Family

Lord McCorquodale married firstly Winifred Sophia Doris, daughter of James Oscar Max Clark, in 1931. They had two daughters, Pamela (b.1934) who married William Forbes of Callendar, and Prudence (b.1936) who married Carel Maurits Mosselmans.

After his first wife's death in November 1960, he married secondly the Honourable Daisy Yoskul Consuelo, daughter of Weetman Pearson, 2nd Viscount Cowdray and widow of both Robert Brampton Gurdon and Alistair Monteith Gibb, in 1962.

Lord McCorquodale died in September 1971, aged 70, when the barony became extinct. Lady McCorquodale died in 1979.

References

External links 

 

 

Mccorquodale of Newton, Malcolm Stewart McCorquodale, 1st Baron
Mccorquodale of Newton, Malcolm Stewart McCorquodale, 1st Baron
Conservative Party (UK) MPs for English constituencies
Conservative Party (UK) hereditary peers
Directors of the Bank of Scotland
Knights Commander of the Royal Victorian Order
Malcolm
Mccorquodale of Newton, Malcolm Stewart McCorquodale, 1st Baron
Ministers in the Churchill wartime government, 1940–1945
People educated at Harrow School
Old West Downs
UK MPs 1931–1935
UK MPs 1935–1945
UK MPs 1945–1950
UK MPs 1950–1951
UK MPs 1951–1955
UK MPs who were granted peerages
Ministers in the Churchill caretaker government, 1945
Royal Air Force Volunteer Reserve personnel of World War II
Royal Air Force officers
Hereditary barons created by Elizabeth II